In the run-up to the 1964 general election, various polling organisations conducted opinion polling to gauge voting intention amongst the general public. Such polls, dating from the previous election in 1959 to polling day on 15 October 1964, are listed in this article.

Polling results 

All Data is from PollBase

1964

1963

1962

1961

1960

1959

References

Opinion polling for United Kingdom general elections